Telphusa latebricola is a moth of the family Gelechiidae. It is found on the British Virgin Islands (Thatch island).

References

Moths described in 1932
Telphusa
Taxa named by Edward Meyrick